"Baby Won't You Please Come Home" is a blues song written by Charles Warfield and Clarence Williams in 1919. The song's authorship is disputed; Warfield claims that he was the sole composer of the song.

The song has been covered by many musicians and has become a jazz standard. The first hit version was Bessie Smith's 1923 recording, which stayed on the charts for four weeks peaking at No. 6.

Renditions

 Bessie Smith (1923)
 Clarence Williams' Blue Five (1927)
 George Thomas with McKinney's Cotton Pickers (1930)
 Clarence Williams and His Orchestra (1930)
 Clarence Williams and His Jazz Kings (1931)
 The Mills Brothers (1932)
 Django Reinhardt (1937)
 Lionel Hampton (1938)
 Louis Armstrong (1939)
 Count Basie Orchestra (1944)
 Bing Crosby with Eddie Heywood, recorded August 9, 1945. 
 Benny Goodman and His Orchestra (1945)
 Jo Stafford with the Nat King Cole Trio (1946)
 Sidney Bechet & His Feetwarmers (1949)
 Ray Charles (1952)
 Jack Teagarden (1954)
 Frank Sinatra - included in his album Where Are You? (1957)
 Louis Prima with Keely Smith (1957)
 Billie Holiday (1959)
 Ricky Nelson (1960)
 Della Reese (1960)
 Ella Fitzgerald on her 1961 Verve release Ella in Hollywood
 Sam Cooke (1962)
 Sarah Vaughan (1962)
 Dinah Washington - Drinking Again (1962) 
 Al Hirt (1962) on his album, Horn A-Plenty
 Miles Davis - Seven Steps to Heaven (1963)
 Dean Martin on his albums Dream with Dean (1964) and The Dean Martin TV Show (1966)
 Gloria Lynne (1965)
 Julie London - Nice Girls Don't Stay for Breakfast (1967)
 James Booker - Junco Partner (1976)
 James Booker - Gonzo James Booker Live 1976 (1967) 
 Coco Briaval (France 1999 album Minor Swing)
 David Sanborn - Only Everything (2010)
 Elisabeth Bougerol (2011) with The Hot Sardines Band
 Kathy Hampson's Free Elastic Band
 Leon Redbone

Film appearances
1945 That's the Spirit - performed by Johnny Coy and Peggy Ryan. 
1986 Act of Vengeance
2008 Igor - performed by Louis Prima.
2018 Rendezvous in Chicago - performed by Eva Taylor

See also
List of pre-1920 jazz standards

References

Songs written by Clarence Williams (musician)
1919 songs
1910s jazz standards
Blues songs
Bessie Smith songs